Triga may refer to:

 TRIGA, a class of small nuclear reactor
 Triga (chariot), an ancient three-horse chariot
 Triga Films, a United Kingdom based gay pornography studio
 Giacomo Triga (1674-1746), Italian painter
 Triga, sculpture in Knightsbridge, London, England, UK; see List of public art in Knightsbridge

See also

 Trigae (National Theatre), Prague, Czechia; a set of sculptures
 wild triga (Thinopyrum intermedium), a type of wheatgrass
 
 Trigga (disambiguation)